"Valley Candle" is a poem from Wallace Stevens's first book of poetry, Harmonium. It is in the public domain  according to Librivox, having been first published prior to the 1923 publication year of Harmonium.

Interpretation

Whalen proposes that most critics see the poem as an allegory of the mind. The candle is ablaze with conscious life, or it has the illuminating power of the creative artist. It may be an apology for the imagination's slanted light, which will not sustain a heavy burden.

One interpretive choice point is whether "Valley Candle" should be compared to "Anecdote of the Jar", as granting ordering power to the candle like the jar's. Rehder proposes the comparison. Both objects create the world from which they come; they are the fixed points, the centers, "necessary to change chaos to order and to communicate purpose." Whalen rejects the comparison.

Notes

References 
Doggett, Frank. Stevens’ Poetry of Thought. The Johns Hopkins University Press, 1966.
Kessler, Edward. Images of Wallace Stevens. Rutgers University Press, 1972.
Rehder, Robert. The Poetry of Wallace Stevens. Macmillan Press, 1988.
Riddel, Joseph N. The Clairvoyant Eye: The Poetry and Poetics of Wallace Stevens. Louisiana State University Press, 1965.
Whalen, Tom. "'Alone in an Immense Valley': A Note on Stevens' `Valley Candle'". Wallace Stevens Journal. 20.2 (Fall 1996)

1917 poems
American poems
Poetry by Wallace Stevens